Lamin Tucker (born September 15, 1982) is a sprinter from Sierra Leone. He competed in the 100 metres at the 2004 Olympic Games failing to reach the second round.

His personal best in the 100 metres is 10.52 from 2004.

Competition record

References

External links
 

1982 births
Living people
Sierra Leonean male sprinters
Olympic athletes of Sierra Leone
Athletes (track and field) at the 2004 Summer Olympics
Commonwealth Games competitors for Sierra Leone
Athletes (track and field) at the 2006 Commonwealth Games
Athletes (track and field) at the 2003 All-Africa Games
African Games competitors for Sierra Leone